ISO 13399 (Cutting tool data representation and exchange) is an international technical standard by ISO (the International Organization for Standardization) for the computer-interpretable representation and exchange of industrial product data about cutting tools and toolholders. The objective is to provide a mechanism capable of describing product data regarding cutting tools, independent from any particular system. The nature of this description makes it suitable not only for neutral file exchange (free of proprietary format constraints), but also as a basis for implementing and sharing product databases and archiving, regarding cutting tools.

Typically ISO 13399 can be used to exchange data between computer-aided design (CAD), computer-aided manufacturing (CAM), computer-aided engineering (CAE), tool management software, product data management (PDM/EDM), manufacturing resource planning (MRP) or enterprise resource planning (ERP), and other computer-aided technologies (CAx) and systems.

The usage of the ISO 13399 standard will simplify the exchange of data for cutting tools. Expected results are lower cost for managing the information about tools and a more accurate and efficient usage of manufacturing resources. The ISO 13399 has been developed with contributions from AB Sandvik Coromant, the Royal Institute of Technology in Stockholm, Kennametal Inc, and Ferroday Ltd.

ISO 13399 is developed and maintained by the ISO technical committee TC 29, Small tools, sub-committee WG34. Like other ISO and IEC standards ISO 13399 is copyright by ISO and is not freely available. Other standards developed and maintained by ISO TC29/WG34 are:



Structure

ISO 13399 is divided into several parts:
 Part 1: Overview, fundamental principles and general information model
 Part 2: Reference dictionary for cutting items
 Part 3: Reference dictionary for tool items
 Part 4: Reference dictionary for adaptive items
 Part 5: Reference dictionary for assembly items
 Part 50: Reference dictionary for reference systems and common concepts
 Part 60: Reference dictionary for connection systems
 Part 100: Definitions, principles and methods for reference dictionaries
 Part 150: Usage guidelines

ISO 13399 defines a data model for cutting tool information using the EXPRESS modelling language. Application data according to this data model can be exchanged either by a STEP-File, STEP-XML or via shared database access using SDAI. 

The dictionary (reference data library) of ISO 13399 currently uses PLIB (ISO 13584, IEC 61360).

Future of ISO13399

See also 
List of ISO standards 12000–13999#ISO_13000_–_ISO_13999

External links
 STEP Ship team  ISO TC 184/SC 4/WG 3/T 23
The STEP Module Repository on SourceForge
CAx Implementor Forum - information on existing implementations and testing activities
 STEP APPLICATION HANDBOOK ISO 10303 VERSION 3
WikiSTEP - tutorial and overview information about STEP and recommended practises
ISO 13399 Maintenance Agency (French/English)
STEP File Analyzer and Viewer

13399
CAD file formats
Machining